Heino is a Finnish surname. Notable people with the surname include:

Henri Heino (born 1986), Finnish ice hockey forward 
Lauri Heino (1918–2001), Finnish military sergeant
Martti and Elise Heino, the victims of the 2001 Heino murders
Otto and Vivika Heino, American ceramic artists 
Pekka Heino (television presenter) (born 1961), Finnish-Swedish television presenter
Pekka Heino (singer) (born 1976), Finnish singer (Brother Firetribe)
Viljo Heino (1914–1998), Finnish track and field athlete and Olympic competitor

See also
Christopher Heino-Lindberg (born 1985), Swedish ice hockey goaltender

Finnish-language surnames